T. J. Turner may refer to:

T. J. Turner (end), American football player
T. J. Turner (linebacker), American football player
Thomas J. Turner, an Illinois politician